The W.A.R. P40E is a near-scale homebuilt replica of a Curtis P-40 Warhawk fighter.

Variants
Some versions were built using  Lycoming O-235 and  HCI radial engines.

Specifications (W.A.R. P40E)

Notes

References

WAR P40E 1/2Scale Replica Curtiss Kitty Hawk

External links

 War Aircraft Replicas International Inc 
 W.A.R. Aircraft Replicas International

Homebuilt aircraft
P-40
Single-engined tractor aircraft
Low-wing aircraft
1970s United States sport aircraft
Replica aircraft